Eli Kelley Cole (September 1, 1867 – July 4, 1929) was the first Assistant to the Commandant of the Marine Corps from 1911 to 1915. He also briefly commanded the 41st Infantry Division at the end of World War I. Cole was awarded the Navy Cross for his service as "Commanding Officer of the First Provisional Brigade of Marines" during the Haitian Campaign from 1915–1917.

Cole graduated from the United States Naval Academy in 1888. He then served two years as an ensign in the U.S. Navy before transferring to the U.S. Marine Corps.

References

Attribution

External links

"Eli Kelly Cole" Gannet Military Times Hall of Valor

1867 births
1929 deaths
United States Marine Corps generals
United States Naval Academy alumni
United States Marine Corps personnel of World War I
Recipients of the Navy Cross (United States)
American military personnel of the Banana Wars
United States Army War College alumni